Ricardo "Joy" B. Cleofas (born February 9, 1951) is a Filipino retired basketball player. 

Cleofas played college ball for the Ateneo de Manila University under coach Nilo Verona. He led Ateneo to a runner-up finish in his first year together with Marte Samson. The Blue Eagles became NCAA champions in 1969 and among his teammates were Samson, Chito Afable, Jun Ross and Francis Arnaiz. After college, he played in the Manila Industrial and Commercial Athletic Association for the YCO Painters. That same year, YCO garnered the National Seniors and Panamin tournament.

Cleofas represented the Philippines in the first Youth team in 1970 that won the first ABC Youth Tournament. Cleofas also appeared at the Olympic Games as a member of the Philippines men's national basketball team in the Munich Olympics. The 1973 Asian Basketball Confederation and the 1974 World Basketball Confederation in Puerto Rico. Joy entered the pro league in the Philippine Basketball Association as a pioneer, playing for Tanduay. As a player, he was known for his ability to shoot from great distances, his accurate passing, and his hustle.

References

1951 births
Living people
Ateneo Blue Eagles men's basketball players
Olympic basketball players of the Philippines
Basketball players at the 1972 Summer Olympics
Philippines men's national basketball team players
Filipino men's basketball players
1974 FIBA World Championship players
Tanduay Rhum Masters players